The Aitkin County Courthouse and Jail, in Aitkin, Minnesota, United States, serves as the county seat of Aitkin County.  The building is actually the second courthouse for the county.  The first courthouse was built in 1888, but in 1920, a grand jury reported that the building was dangerous and "falling apart".  After difficulties securing financing, the county commissioners approved a plan for a new courthouse, which was finished in 1929.  The design mixes Beaux-Arts architecture and Moderne elements.  The interior features marble wainscoting, oak woodwork, terrazzo floors, and stained glass skylights.

References

External links

Beaux-Arts architecture in Minnesota
Aitkin, Minnesota
County courthouses in Minnesota
County government buildings in Minnesota
Courthouses on the National Register of Historic Places in Minnesota
Defunct prisons in Minnesota
Jails on the National Register of Historic Places in Minnesota
National Register of Historic Places in Aitkin County, Minnesota
1929 establishments in Minnesota
Streamline Moderne architecture in Minnesota